Goodbye Mr Mackenzie is a Scottish rock band formed in Bathgate near Edinburgh. At the band's commercial peak, the line-up consisted of Martin Metcalfe on vocals, John Duncan on guitar, Fin Wilson on bass guitar, Shirley Manson and Rona Scobie on keyboards and backing vocals, and Derek Kelly on drums.

The band came to prominence in the early 1980s after releasing two independent label singles, and were signed to Capitol Records. They charted in the UK with their debut album, Good Deeds and Dirty Rags, and single release "The Rattler" but the band were hindered by record company conflicts and failed to break through outside the UK. The band split up in 1993, leaving Manson, Metcalfe, Wilson and Kelly to form Angelfish to continue recording music. Manson left for Garbage in 1994, and Goodbye Mr Mackenzie played their final live show at the end of 1995.

Career
The band began when Martin Metcalfe moved on from his first band Teenage Dog Orgy in 1984. They were named after author Jean Rhys's 1931 novel After Leaving Mr. Mackenzie.

Their first single was released through a pilot music industry course run by Bathgate College under the Youth Training Scheme, a split-single 7-inch format of "Death of a Salesman" in 1984. Limited to 1,000 copies, and with a track by Lindy Bergman on the flipside, it quickly sold out. Shortly after, They signed a management deal with Precious Organisation, who had just launched another Scottish group, Wet Wet Wet. Precious managed to include both groups on Honey at the Core, a 1986 compilation of up and coming Scottish acts compiled by Glasgow Herald journalist John Williamson, and released the band's first commercial single "The Rattler". The single suffered from a lack of distribution, but received airplay on Radio One and Radio Clyde. A home-made music video for the single was broadcast on The Chart Show. The band also performed "The Rattler" on The Tube. Precious organised an A&R showcase in Glasgow but, as the band did not receive any interest from the labels invited, they chose to leave Precious.

After leaving their management, they released an independent 12-inch single, "Face to Face", in 1987, and signed a major label record deal with Capitol Records. Capitol issued three multi-formatted singles, of which a re-release of "The Rattler" was the most successful, charting at No. 37 in 1989. The label followed up the band's chart debut with Good Deeds and Dirty Rags, which reached No. 23 on the UK Albums Chart. A further single from the album, "Goodwill City", reversed the band's upward trend, stalling at No. 49. Capitol ended the year by releasing Fish Heads and Tails, a mid-price live and B-side compilation, while the band relocated to studios in Berlin to record their second album. While at the studios, the band witnessed the Fall of the Berlin Wall.

The following year, the band were transferred sideways across EMI, from Capitol to Parlophone, who released two new recordings "Love Child" and "Blacker Than Black" (the latter being released across Europe and in North America) as taster singles. Both tracks failed to gain on the chart position set by "The Rattler" a year prior, and in response Parlophone cancelled the planned album release for the group's second set, titled Hammer and Tongs. The band continued to tour heavily, became radio mainstays on Scottish radio and performed at the televised concert "The Big Day" on Glasgow Green.

Gary Kurfirst, who managed Talking Heads and Debbie Harry, bought the band's contract from Parlophone and signed them to his own label, Radioactive, a subsidiary of MCA. Radioactive were keen to release the band's second album, but required a chart friendly track. They completed recording "Now We Are Married", in Edinburgh, and Radioactive issued it as a single ahead of Hammer and Tongs. Both releases again failed to chart, and  the group were persuaded to leave the label by their management. Radioactive meanwhile released a compilation of the band's two albums self-titled as Goodbye Mr. Mackenzie in North America, Europe, Australia and Japan.

The band continued to write material; Manson was also given the opportunity to record lead vocals on a number of tracks planned for the band's third album, titled Five. In the end, Manson only featured on a duet, "Normal Boy". The band issued the album on their own Blokshok label.

Side project: Angelfish
With relations between MCA and the band's management hitting a low point the band left MCA. Gary Kurfirst wanted to keep working with the band and suggested they record a whole album with Shirley Manson on lead vocals, and after hearing several demos, Kurfirst signed Manson to Radioactive as a solo artist, with Metcalfe, Kelly and Wilson signing the publishing deal. Recording under the name Angelfish, and using some of the newly written material and a previously released Mackenzie B-side, Manson and the group recorded the tracks that would make up the Angelfish album in Connecticut with Talking Heads' Chris Frantz and Tina Weymouth. A lead in track "Suffocate Me" sent to college radio where it was well received. Angelfish and second single "Heartbreak to Hate" followed in 1994. Angelfish toured the United States, Canada, France, Belgium, and co-supported Live on a tour of North America, along with Vic Chesnutt. The music video for "Suffocate Me" was aired on MTV's 120 Minutes. Producer and musician Steve Marker saw the broadcast and thought Manson would be a great singer for his band, Garbage, which also featured producers Duke Erikson and Butch Vig. Manson left Angelfish, and The Mackenzies, to join the group.

Post-Goodbye Mr Mackenzie
Manson left for Garbage in 1994. Derek Kelly, Fin Wilson and Martin Metcalfe formed a new band, Isa & the Filthy Tongues with American singer Stacey Chavis.

Reformation
In an interview with the Edinburgh Evening News on 4 April 2019, Martin Metcalfe announced that Goodbye Mr Mackenzie would be reforming and would be performing a mini Scottish Tour. Warm up gigs were performed in Dundee on 17 May and Dunfermline on 18 May, followed by full shows in Glasgow at The Garage (venue of their farewell concert) on 22 May, Aberdeen Lemon Tree on 23 May and Edinburgh Liquid Rooms on 25 and 26 May 2019. These shows were followed up by a winter tour of the UK, culminating in a sold out performance at the Glasgow Barrowlands on 20 December.

During interviews to promote their tour, Metcalfe revealed that a number of hurdles had to be overcome to reunite the band, including Duncan's multiple sclerosis and the fact that Scobie had not played keyboard in over 20 years. He described Duncan's ability to relearn his guitar parts in spite of his ongoing health concerns as "something of a miracle". A documentary about the reunion entitled Until the End of the Road was released in 2020.

A live album entitled A Night in the Windy City was released in February 2021 and featured their 2019 performance at the Glasgow Barrowlands.

Discography
Albums

Singles

An early track, "Skimming Stones", appeared on the 1986 compilation cassette Honey at the Core.

References

External links
 Official Website Goodbye Mr Mackenzie

Scottish rock music groups
Scottish alternative rock groups
Scottish new wave musical groups
Musical groups established in 1981
Musical groups disestablished in 1996
Musical groups reestablished in 2019
1981 establishments in Scotland